Tauragnas is the deepest lake in Lithuania reaching 62.5 metres of depth. The surface area is 5.13 km2 and average depth 18.7 m. It is situated in Aukštaitija National Park near Tauragnai in Utena County. This is also a lake with the highest altitude (above sea level) in Lithuania.

See also
Lakes of Lithuania

Tauragnas